Salient Mountain is located on the border of Alberta and British Columbia. It is Alberta's 80th most prominent mountain. It was named in 1922 by Arthur O. Wheeler. It was noted to be the "sharpest" peak in the area.

See also
 List of peaks on the Alberta–British Columbia border
 Mountains of Alberta
 Mountains of British Columbia

References

Salient Mountain
Salient Mountain
Canadian Rockies